Queen's funeral may refer to:

Funeral Sentences and Music for the Funeral of Queen Mary, music by Henry Purcell, 1695
State funeral of Queen Victoria, 1901
Death and funeral of Queen Elizabeth The Queen Mother, 2002 
Death and state funeral of Elizabeth II, 2022